One Shoreline Plaza in Corpus Christi, Texas overlooks Corpus Christi Bay and consists of 2 skyscrapers, north and south, south being the tallest, and the tallest building in South Texas south of San Antonio. It is the most prominent figure in the skyline of the city.

Images

External links
North tower, Emporis.com
South tower, Emporis.com
Parking garage, Emporis.com

Buildings and structures in Corpus Christi, Texas
Skyscrapers in Texas
Skyscraper office buildings in Texas
Twin towers
Office buildings completed in 1988